Prince Wilson Olomu  (born 24 December 1986, in Maiduguri) is a Nigerian football midfielder who played in the South African Premier Soccer League. Olomu was the second leading goal scorer in the PSL with 13 goals for the 2009-10 season.

References

External links

Prince Wilson Olomu Video Highlights

1986 births
Living people
People from Borno State
Nigerian footballers
Nigerian expatriate footballers
El-Kanemi Warriors F.C. players
Enyimba F.C. players
Free State Stars F.C. players
Bloemfontein Celtic F.C. players
Maritzburg United F.C. players
Royal Eagles F.C. players
Association football midfielders
Expatriate soccer players in South Africa
Nigerian expatriate sportspeople in South Africa